Rio Bonito can refer to:

 East Biggs, California, community formerly called Rio Bonito
 Rio Bonito (New Mexico), a river in Lincoln County, New Mexico
 Rio Bonito, Guatemala
 Rio Bonito, Honduras
 Rio Bonito, Venezuela, a town in Monagas state, Venezuela

Brazil
 Rio Bonito, Parana
 Rio Bonito, Rio de Janeiro
 Rio Bonito, São Paulo, a town in São Paulo, also known as Bairro Rio Bonito
 Rio Bonito, Santa Catarina
 Caiapônia, a municipality in south-central Goiás state, Brazil, also known as Rio Bonito

See also
 Rio Bonito Atlético Clube, a football (soccer) team in Rio de Janeiro
 Bonito River (disambiguation)